Second five-eighths, or sometimes second five-eighth, is a name used in New Zealand to refer the rugby union position commonly known elsewhere as the inside centre or number 12.

It traditionally described a playmaking type of 12 with good passing and kicking skills as opposed to the strong hard runner and tackler in that position providing less game-management and attacking options. Some second five-eighths such as Sonny Bill Williams and Ma’a Nonu, however, combine aspects of both styles of play.

Etymology
The 1903 All Black captain, Jimmy Duncan, is credited with coining the name five-eighths when he decided to take a player from the forwards to add to the backs. The backs at that time consisted of two half-backs, three three-quarters, and a full-back. As the additional player stood between half-back and three-quarters, Duncan came up with the term five-eighths according to the fraction between them.

The player at five-eighths, also known as the five-eighth, could take the ball back to the forwards or pass it on to the three-quarters. This backline innovation occurred before the split between rugby union and rugby league in Australia and New Zealand and the term is now commonly used for the five-eighth position in rugby league football.

As the game of rugby union evolved, the two half-back positions acquired separate functions. The outside half-back, now known as the outhalf or fly-half, became the first five-eighths in New Zealand under the two five-eighths system. The next player on his outside was called the second five-eighths.

The terms first-five and second-five are sometimes used as abbreviated versions of first five-eighths and second five-eighths, respectively.

Notable second five-eighths
New Zealand All Blacks:
Walter Little
Aaron Mauger
Ma'a Nonu
Tana Umaga
Sonny Bill Williams
Australian Wallabies:
Tim Horan
Matt Giteau
Christian Lealiifano
Matt To'omua

See also
Rugby union positions§Centre

References

Sources

Rugby union positions